Parth Laghate (born 11 March 1991) known as Parth Samthaan is an Indian actor. He started off his acting career by featuring in Gumrah: End of Innocence as Siddharth and Best Friends Forever? as Prithvi Sanyal both in the same year. Samthaan rose to fame after portraying Manik Malhotra in Kaisi Yeh Yaariaan and Anurag Basu in Kasautii Zindagii Kay.

Career
Samthaan started off his acting career by featuring in episodics like Life OK's Savdhaan India, MTV India's Webbed, Bindass's Yeh Hai Aashiqui and Zing's Pyaar Tune Kya Kiya.

In 2012, he portrayed Prithvi Sanyal in Channel V's Best Friends Forever? opposite Charlie Chauhan. From 2014 to 2015, he portrayed Manik Malhotra in MTV India's Kaisi Yeh Yaariaan opposite Niti Taylor for seasons 1 and 2. In 2018, he reappeared as Manik Malhotra for seasons 3 and 4.

Samthaan signed his first Bollywood debut, Googly Ho Gayi in 2016. He also attempted playback singing for his second song Jind Meri. In 2018, he returned to play Manik Malhotra in Voot's Kaisi Yeh Yaariaan 3. 

From 2018 to 2020, Samthaan portrayed Anurag Basu opposite Erica Fernandes in Star Plus's Kasautii Zindagii Kay for which he won the Indian Telly Award for Best Jodi Popular and Kalakar Award for Best Actor Popular.

In 2019, he played Faizal Alghazi in ALT Balaji's Kehne Ko Humsafar Hain 2 opposite Pooja Banerjee. 

In 2020, he was seen in ALT Balaji's web-series Mai Hero Boll Raha Hu.

In 2022, he returned to play Manik Malhotra in Voot's Kaisi Yeh Yaariaan 4 and 5

He is all set to make his Bollywood debut with the upcoming film Ghudchadhi.

Media
In 2015, Samthaan was placed 11th in Eastern Eyes Top 50 Sexiest Asian Men List.

He was ranked 3rd in Times of Indias 25 "Most Desirable Men on Television" List, 2018. In 2019, he was listed 2nd on the same list and maintained his position at 2nd rank in 2020 as well.

He was also ranked in The Times Most Desirable Men at No. 22 in 2019, at No. 20 in 2020.

Filmography

Films

Television

Special appearances

Web series

Music videos

Awards and nominations 

 List of Indian television actors

References

External links

1991 births
21st-century Indian male actors
Indian male television actors
Living people